Pseudopalaemon is a genus of shrimps belonging to the family Palaemonidae.

The species of this genus are found in Southern America.

Species:

Pseudopalaemon amazonensis 
Pseudopalaemon bouvieri 
Pseudopalaemon chryseus 
Pseudopalaemon funchiae 
Pseudopalaemon gouldingi 
Pseudopalaemon iquitoensis 
Pseudopalaemon nigramnis

References

Palaemonidae